Milton Castro (born 29 January 1976) is a Colombian taekwondo practitioner. He competed in the men's +80 kg event at the 2000 Summer Olympics.

References

External links
 

1976 births
Living people
Colombian male taekwondo practitioners
Olympic taekwondo practitioners of Colombia
Taekwondo practitioners at the 2000 Summer Olympics
Place of birth missing (living people)
Pan American Games medalists in taekwondo
Pan American Games bronze medalists for Colombia
Medalists at the 1995 Pan American Games
Taekwondo practitioners at the 1995 Pan American Games
20th-century Colombian people